H. Earl Clack Service Station in Saco, Montana, is a site on the National Register of Historic Places .  The service station was added to the Register on August 16, 1994.  It has also been known as Clack Station.

It was one of a number of gas stations in H. Earl Clack's chain of filling stations, and was probably built in the early 1930s.  It was used as a gas station into the 1960s, and in 1994 served as restrooms for a park.

See also
H. Earl Clack House, NRHP-listed in Hill County, Montana

References

Retail buildings in Montana
Gas stations on the National Register of Historic Places in Montana
National Register of Historic Places in Phillips County, Montana
Streamline Moderne architecture in Montana
Commercial buildings completed in 1932
1932 establishments in Montana